Open-book management (OBM) is a management phrase coined by John Case of Inc. magazine, who began using the term in 1993. The concept's most visible success has been achieved by Jack Stack and his team at SRC Holdings.

The basis of open-book management is that the information received by employees should not only help them do their jobs effectively but help them understand how the company is doing as a whole. According to Case, "a company performs best when its people see themselves as partners in the business rather than as hired hands" (Case,1998 as cited in Pascarella, 1998). The technique is to give employees all relevant financial information about the company so they can make better decisions as workers.  This information includes, but is not limited to, revenue, profit, cost of goods, cash flow and expenses.

Stack and Case conceptualize open-book principles in similar ways.

Stack uses three basic principles in his management practice called, The Great Game of Business. 
His basic rules for open-book management are: 
Know and teach the rules: every employee should be given the measures of business success and taught to understand them 
Follow the Action & Keep Score: Every employee should be expected and enabled to use their knowledge to improve performance
Provide a Stake in the Outcome: Every employee should have a direct stake in the company's success-and in the risk of failure

Similarly, in 1995, Case made sense of open-book with three main points:
The company should share finances as well as critical data with all employees
Employees are challenged to move the numbers in a direction that improves the company
Employees share in company prosperity

In a company fully employing open-book management employees at all levels are very knowledgeable about how their job fits into the financial plan for the company.  However taking a company from "normal" to open is not as easy as just sharing financial statements with employees. Open-book management is considered to be a success when companies allow improvements on their financial numbers to come from the bottom tier of employee rather than pressure exerted by a traditional top-down management system. (Johnson, 1992 as cited in Aggarwal & Simkins, 2001). While employees need to be trained to understand income statements and balance sheets; open-book management aims to achieve a level of understanding of company finances between all employees to the degree that they are able to report predictions to upper management. In order to motivate employees to strive for change, open-book management focuses on a "Critical Number". The number is different for every company but it is a number that represents a prime indicator of profitability or break-even point.  Discovering this Critical Number is a key component of creating an open-book company.  Once this is discovered, a "Scoreboard" is developed that brings together all the numbers needed to calculate the critical number.  The Scoreboard is open for all to see and meetings take place to discuss how individuals can influence the direction of the "Score" and therefore, ultimately, the performance against the Critical Number.  Finally a Stake in the Outcome is provided which can be a bonus plan that is tied to Critical Number performance or it can include Equity sharing or both.

Conferences
The Great Game of Business Conference is the only practitioner-led conference on creating a culture of ownership by teaching employees to think and act like owners . At the event, business leaders learn from people who have used open-book management to increase the size, profitability and employee engagement in their companies . The conference consists of sessions, keynote speakers and workshops that are specifically targeted to each phase of open-book management.

Notes and references

Shaffer, J. (2000). The Leadership Solution. McGraw-Hill 38–40, 98, 159; 
 Open-source radio interview of a CEO explaining how his company functions under open-book management. Interview

Human resource management